"What Am I Gonna Do (With the Rest of My Life)" is a song written and recorded by American country music artist Merle Haggard backed by The Strangers.  It was released in July 1983 as the first single from the album That's the Way Love Goes.  The song reached number 3 on the Billboard Hot Country Singles & Tracks chart. In 2019, Montgomery Gentry released the song off the album Outskirts.

Chart performance

References

1983 singles
1983 songs
Merle Haggard songs
Montgomery Gentry songs
Songs written by Merle Haggard
Ray Baker
Epic Records singles